Princess Anna Elizabeth Reuss of Köstritz (9 January 1837 in Dresden – 2 February 1907 in Wernigerode), was a princess of Reuss by birth and by marriage countess, and after 1890 princess, of Stolberg-Wernigerode.

Life 
Anna was the daughter of Prince Henry LXIII, Prince Reuss of Köstritz (1786–1841) and his second wife Countess Caroline of Stolberg-Wernigerode (1806–1899).

Anna spent her childhood at Staniszów Castle in Silesia.  She was artistically talented and in 1862 she went to Berlin, where she received painting and music lessons and met Count Otto of Stolberg-Wernigerode, whom she married on 22 August 1863 at Staniszów Castle.

In 1890 her husband was raise to Prince of Stolberg-Wernigerode.  His political rise allowed a major expansion of Wernigerode Castle, which lasted from 1862 to 1893.  The castle was restructured in a historicistic style; Anna was creatively involved in this endeavour.  She and her daughters and daughters-in-law created the eight large tapestries in the Castle Church.

Anna also wrote numerous plays and poems. The best known among these are "Jagd am Hubertustag" and "Holtemme".

Issue 
From her marriage to Otto, Anna had 7 children:
 Christian Ernest (1864–1940), Prince of Stolberg-Wernigerode
 married in 1891 Countess Marie of Castell-Rüdenhausen (1864–1942)
 Elizabeth (1866–1928)
 married in 1885 Count Constantin of Stolberg-Wernigerode (1843–1905)
 Hermann (1867–1913)
 married in 1910 princess Dorothea of Solms-Hohensolms-Lich (1883–1942), daughter of Hermann of Solms-Hohensolms-Lich
 William (1870–1932)
 married in 1910 Princess Elizabeth of Erbach-Schönberg (1883–1966)
 Henry (1871–1874)
 Marie (1872–1950)
 married in 1902 Count William of Solms-Laubach (1861–1936)
 Emma (1875–1956)
 married in 1894 Prince Charles of Solms-Hohensolms-Lich (1866–1920)

Ancestry

References 
 Konrad Breitenborn: Graf Otto zu Stolberg-Wernigerode: Deutscher Standesherr und Politiker der Bismarckzeit. Ausgewählte Dokumente, Jüttners Buchhandlung, Wernigerode, 1993, 
 Konrad Breitenborn (eds.): Die Lebenserinnerungen des Fürsten Otto zu Stolberg-Wernigerode (1837–1896), Jüttners Buchhandlung, Wernigerode 1996, 
 Sunhild Minkner: Bemerkenswerte Frauen, paperback, Wernigerode 1999

Anna
Anna
German countesses
1837 births
1907 deaths
19th-century German people